The Robert J. Trulaske Sr. College of Business, more commonly known as the Trulaske College of Business, is the second largest academic division at the University of Missouri in Columbia, Missouri.

History
The College of Business was established as a senior professional school on January 19, 1914 as the School of Commerce. The first faculty was appointed that same year with professor Herbert J. Davenport as the first dean. The College of Business's prestigious donor organization was named The Herbert J. Davenport Society to pay tribute to the first dean. The name of the school was changed to the School of Commerce and Public Administration in 1916, and later that year, Dean Davenport resigned to accept a professorship in economics at Cornell University. The name of the school was changed again in 1917 to the School of Business and Public Administration.

The College's business programs were among the first in the nation to be accredited. The American Association of Collegiate Schools of Business (AACSB) was established in 1916, and in 1926 the Trulaske College of Business became the first public business school in Missouri to earn accreditation from AACSB. The college was also a leader in offering a PhD degree in business-related fields.

The College of Business has made its home in several buildings throughout its history. The original Commerce Building was the north part of Swallow Hall on Francis Quadrangle. In 1927, the school moved to the former quarters of the law school, which was renamed the Business and Public Administration Building. This location is now part of the Donald W. Reynolds Journalism Institute. Middlebush Hall was constructed in 1959 as the new home for the college, and it was named for Frederick A. Middlebush, who had served as Dean of the School of Business and Public Administration and President of the University.

By 1990, enrollment at the college had significantly outgrown the more than 30-year-old Middlebush Hall, and classes had to be held in several other buildings. MU began to draft plans for a new business building in 1994, and on September 18, 1999, the university broke ground on a new home for the College of Business, and it would be twice the size of Middlebush when completed. The 150,000-square-foot Cornell Hall was completed in 2002 at a cost of nearly $30 million. The state-of-the-art facility is named for Harry M. Cornell Jr., who is chairman emeritus of Leggett & Platt. Cornell graduated from the college in 1950, and he and his wife have donated over $7 million to the college. [Need to change [2] link to https://business.missouri.edu/cornell-hall]

In 2007, the University of Missouri announced that its College of Business would officially be named the Robert J. Trulaske Sr. College of Business. The change came from a series of large gifts from Geraldine Trulaske, in honor of her late husband, Robert J. Trulaske Sr., founder of True Manufacturing. The College of Business is one of only two named academic divisions at the University of Missouri, the other being the Sinclair School of Nursing.

On Dec. 20, 2021, Christopher Robert became the interim dean for the College of Business. Interim Dean Christopher Robert served as the associate dean for graduate programs and research from 2017 to 2021 here at the Trulaske College of Business.

Departments

School of Accountancy
Ranked in the top 15 nationally in the 2019 Public Accounting Report, this program confers both a BS and MAcc upon graduation. High-quality students are admitted to the program at the start of their junior year. The School has a record of excellent performance on CPA exams including numerous high score winners for the AICPA Elijah Watt Sells Award. 

The School of Accountancy supports a strong, technologically enhanced curriculum including data analytics, integration of ERP and e-business through MU’s alliance with SAP. Additional offerings are available, including certification in tax and assurance. Students benefit from excellent job placement with more than 90 percent of students completing professional internships and more than 90 percent obtaining full-time positions upon graduation.

Finance Department
Students earning an emphasis in finance will be prepared for a variety of careers in financial management or in financial services such as investment management, commercial banking, investment banking, real estate and risk management. The Finance Department is focused on preparing students to analyze financial data and forecasts to produce information and make investment, business and financial decisions.

Management Department 
Management students will learn the skills needed to lead projects, departments, small businesses and global enterprises. Management coursework at Mizzou is diverse because managing both today and in the future requires a strong set of skills and abilities: entrepreneurial strategy, human resource management, human behavior in organizations, supply chain management, information systems/analytics, business law, diversity and inclusion and leadership and ethics.

Marketing Department 
The Department of Marketing teaches students the activities that direct the flow of goods and services to the consumer or user. Courses span the domains of marketing management, sales management, marketing communications, and retail and services marketing. Course topics in this area include personal selling, sales analytics, advertising and promotion, retail marketing, brand management and distribution, marketing management, sales management, digital marketing, supply chain, procurement and services marketing. 

Marketing students at Mizzou will understand the strategies, tactics and business processes involved in researching markets, deciding which markets and segments to pursue, identifying what unique value to provide and then assembling the products, services, people and partner firms needed to build, communicate and deliver that value. Students studying this emphasis area gain a well-rounded marketing education with opportunities to specialize.

Programs

Undergraduate programs 
The Trulaske College of Business cultivates an instructional environment that ensures that graduates have a competitive advantage as they enter the workforce. Under the Missouri Method -- a combination of a solid core curriculum, relevant courses and hands-on learning -- students learn how to excel in the classroom and beyond. 

With the Trulaske Edge program, Business Career Services, study abroad and leadership opportunities in student organizations and business fraternities, Mizzou business students are exposed to opportunities for both career and personal development throughout their time on campus. 

At Trulaske, all undergraduate students participate in internships, applying classroom knowledge to the world of business. These experiences allow students to gain valuable experience while honing both their skills and their professionalism.

Graduate programs 

 Crosby MBA 

The Crosby MBA provides global access to award-winning Mizzou faculty and an opportunity to earn an MBA at a pace that fits in your busy schedule. The 100% online Crosby MBA has flexible enrollment options for working professionals that wish to pursue their graduate degree part-time and for students that wish to enroll full-time and complete their degree in as few as three semesters.

 execMBA

The execMBA at Trulaske was designed based on the philosophy that people who are interested in advancing themselves want to be surrounded by others who also have a similar drive, energy and intellect. Connecting to those in your cohort during the on-campus sessions adds meaning to the discussions and online portion of the program.

 MS in Business

The Trulaske Master of Science in Business is a customizable interdisciplinary degree program that allows you to craft a business degree to suit your unique educational needs and career goals. This innovative program provides knowledge of business fundamentals through 12 core graduate business hours and allows you to further expand your education with the selection of two graduate certificates from colleges throughout the University of Missouri.

 Online MS in Finance

Mizzou’s online MS in Finance degree is for individuals who want to enhance their analytical and financial decision-making skills. This program is designed for a variety of prospective students depending on where they stand in their professional or educational career. The MS in Finance degree will distinguish students from their peers in the job market. Students will grow their knowledge of key topics in securities analysis (equity, fixed-income, derivative securities), portfolio management, data analysis, financial modeling and more.

 Online MAcc

The Online Master of Accountancy will require the completion of 30 credit hours, 15 of which must be at the 8000 graduate level, during a minimum of three consecutive semesters (Fall, Spring and Summer). Students may take the coursework over multiple years to assist with professional and personal commitments.

 Graduate Certificates

Graduate certificates can be pursued as stand-alone certificates, combined to build a flexible, interdisciplinary Master of Science in Business, or incorporated into the Crosby MBA curriculum.

PhD 
The Trulaske College of Business trains researchers and instructors who will go on to make a difference in fiscal policy and business practices as well as in the lives of future generations in business. The program is rigorous and dynamic, combining a strong analytical focus with the flexibility to tailor your studies to the topics that interest you.

Most PhD candidates are provided the opportunity to teach undergraduate courses in their specialty area. In addition, students are expected to participate in national and regional academic conferences and are encouraged to work with faculty in developing individual research and teaching skills. PhD candidates can concentrate their studies on Accountancy, Finance, Marketing, and Management. The programs are designed for students wishing to pursue full-time PhD studies.

Student Life & Organizations 
The College of Business is home to nearly 20 professional organizations, honor societies, and fraternities. The college's history of influential student organizations can be traced back to 1919 when Alpha Kappa Psi began to organize a chapter that would officially charter the following year. Delta Sigma Pi established itself as the second all-male fraternity at the school when it established a chapter in 1923. A women's business fraternity, Phi Chi Theta, followed in 1926. The college's Upsilon chapter is currently the largest chapter in all of Alpha Kappa Psi, and likewise, the college's Alpha Beta chapter is the largest chapter in all of Delta Sigma Pi. The prestigious Beta Gamma Sigma honor society established its chapter at the school in 1931. The tradition known as Commerce Day was held each spring starting in 1931, and it has since developed into the current Business Week that takes place each spring at the college.

Other student organizations include but are not limited to:

 Association of Accounting Students
 Association of Trulaske Business Women
 Beta Alpha Psi
 Black Business Students Association
 Collegiate DECA
 Diverse Student Association
 Student Council

Notable alumni
Alan C. Greenberg (BS BA '49), Vice Chairman Emeritus, J.P. Morgan Chase & Company
E. Stanley Kroenke (BS BA '71, MBA '73), Chairman, THF Realty, owner, NBA's Denver Nuggets, NHL's Colorado Avalanche; co-owner NFL's St. Louis Rams, co-owner Premier League's Arsenal F.C.
Kenneth Lay (BA '64, MA '65, ΒΘΠ, ΟΔΚ, ΦΒΚ), former CEO of Enron
Rodger O. Riney (BS CiE '68, MBA '69), founder of Scottrade, deep-discount brokerage firm
Matthew K. Rose (BS BA '81, ΛΧΑ), Chairman, CEO, and President, Burlington Northern Santa Fe
Sam Walton (BA '40, ΒΘΠ, QEBH), founder of Wal-Mart

References

External links

University of Missouri
Business schools in Missouri
Educational institutions established in 1914
University of Missouri campus
University subdivisions in Missouri
1914 establishments in Missouri